C. paniculatum may refer to:
 Canarium paniculatum, a plant species endemic to Mauritius
 Cleisostoma paniculatum, an orchid species
 Combretum paniculatum, a plant species found in Africa